Hoeffken Lake is a lake in Carver County, Minnesota, in the United States.

Hoeffken Lake was named for Henry Hoeffken, an early settler. Hoeffken Lake is situated southwest of Bongards, east of County Ditch Number Four A.

See also
List of lakes in Minnesota

References

Lakes of Minnesota
Lakes of Carver County, Minnesota